The Military Archbishopric of Spain is a military ordinariate of the Roman Catholic Church. Immediately subject to the Holy See, it provides pastoral care to Roman Catholics serving in the Spanish Armed Forces and their families.

History
The first military vicariate-general, Carlos de Borja y Centellas, was appointed in 1705, but the position lapsed in abeyance in 1930. Twenty years later, a military vicariate was re-established on 5 August 1950, and a few months later a military vicar was appointed on 12 December 1950. It was elevated to a military ordinariate on 21 July 1986 and is headed by an archbishop. The Episcopal seat is located at the Cathedral of the Armed Forces (Catedral de las Fuerzas Armadas) in Madrid, Spain.

Office holders

Military bishops
Jaime Cardona y Tur (appointed 11 July 1892 – died 6 January 1923)
 Ramón Pérez y Rodríguez (appointed 7 January 1929 – translated to the Patriarchate of the West Indies 30 June 1930)

Military vicars
Luis Alonso Muñoyerro (appointed 12 December 1950 – died 23 September 1968)
 José López Ortiz, O.S.A. (appointed 18 February 1969 – retired 28 May 1977)
 Emilio Benavent Escuín (appointed 25 May 1977 – resigned 27 October 1982)
 José Manuel Estepa Llaurens (appointed 30 July 1983 – became Military Ordinary 21 July 1986)

Military ordinaries
 José Manuel Estepa Llaurens (appointed 21 July 1986 – retired 30 October 2003)
 Francisco Pérez González (appointed 30 October 2003 – translated to the Archdiocese of Pamplona y Tudela 31 July 2007)
 Juan del Río Martín (appointed 30 June 2008 – died 28 January 2021)
 Juan Antonio Aznárez Cobo (appointed 15 November 2021)

Noncombatant status
See: Military chaplain#Non-combatant status

Rank insignias

See also

General Vicar of the Armies
Patron saints of the military
Military chaplain
Cruz Fidélitas

References

External links
Arzobispado Castrense de España official website (in Spanish)
 Military Ordinariate of Spain (Catholic-Hierarchy)
  (GCatholic.org)

Roman Catholic dioceses in Spain
Spain
+
Military of Spain